Moon's Milk (In Four Phases) is a release by Coil that compiles four of their singles onto a double CD. The two disc album compiles the CD versions of Spring Equinox, Summer Solstice, Autumn Equinox and Winter Solstice (originally recorded throughout 1998, and released seasonally from March 1998 to January 1999). The album also has a live version of "Amethyst Deceivers" hidden at the end of the first disc, following several minutes of silence after "A Warning From The Sun (For Fritz)". This recording of "Amethyst Deceivers" was later released on Live Two, although the Moon's Milk version is a slightly longer edit. The release was given the catalog number ESKATON 023 and features artwork by Steven Stapleton.

Background
At the time of release, a mail order edition was offered for an additional $85, comprising the standard 2-CD set with the Moons Milk (In Four Phases) Bonus Disc, a CDr of extra material presented in sleeves that John Balance had individually hand-painted. The bonus disc was limited to 333 copies, 300 of which were offered for sale and 33 of which were supposedly withheld by Balance for his personal collection.

Moon's Milk (In Six Phases)
In 2006, Threshold House announced Moon's Milk (In Six Phases), a "deluxe gallery edition" 3CD/book set that was to compile their four Equinox and Solstice EPs, the three tracks from the Moons Milk (In Four Phases) Bonus Disc and "some new reinterpretations of those songs". The book was to feature photographs of the 333 hand-painted covers for the Moon's Milk (In Four Phases) Bonus Disc along with a listing of their titles and respective owners.

While the Black Antlers and The Remote Viewer re-releases were made available as announced, Christopherson was never to issue Moon's Milk (In Six Phases) in his lifetime. His passing makes it uncertain whether the package will ever eventuate as at this stage there have been no further Coil releases. Danny Hyde, who worked with Christopherson on the proposed reissue, eventually released the additional material that had been intended for the third disc of the set. Issued as Moon's Milk in Final Phase, the three tracks were credited to Electric Sewer Age rather than Coil.

Personnel
 John Balance
 Peter Christopherson
 William Breeze
 Drew McDowall
 Rose McDowall
 Thighpaulsandra

Track listing
Disc A:
 "Moon's Milk Or Under An Unquiet Skull" - 8:29
 "Moon's Milk Or Under An Unquiet Skull" - 8:09
 "Bee Stings" - 4:55
 "Glowworms/Waveforms" - 5:54
 "Summer Substructures" - 8:07
 "A Warning From The Sun (For Fritz)"/"Amethyst Deceivers" - 16:33

Disc B:
 "Regel" - 1:17
 "Rosa Decidua" - 4:55
 "Switches" - 4:45
 "The Auto-Asphyxiating Hierophant" - 5:58
 "Amethyst Deceivers" - 6:37
 "A White Rainbow" - 8:57
 "North" - 3:46
 "Magnetic North" - 8:56
 "Christmas Is Now Drawing Near" - 3:28

References

External links
 
 
 Moon's Milk (In Four Phases) at Brainwashed

2002 compilation albums
Coil (band) compilation albums